The Blackwater Bossing is a professional basketball team owned by Ever Bilena, Inc. that is playing in the Philippine Basketball Association (PBA) beginning in the 2014–2015 season. The franchise began as one of the founding teams in the PBA Developmental League. It transferred to the PBA after being accepted as an expansion team. The team is named after the Ever Bilena's brand of men's fragrances.

History

PBA D-League

Blackwater was one of the founding teams in the PBA Developmental League (PBA D-League). It won one PBA D-League championship. The team's predecessor was the Blu Detergent team in the Philippine Basketball League (PBL), best known as the first Philippine basketball team of Asi Taulava.

PBA
On April 10, 2014, Ever Bilena Cosmetics, Inc., along with Manila North Tollways Corporation (NLEX Road Warriors) and Columbian Autocar Corporation (Kia Sorento) were given approval by the PBA Board of Governors to become expansion teams in the PBA. Upon entry to the PBA, the three teams will select players from a dispersal draft in July consisting of unprotected current PBA players and free agents. They will also get to pick rookies in the 2014 PBA draft in August.

Blackwater and the NLEX Road Warriors became the first franchises to enter the PBA from its D-League.

With the help of Gilas player Marcus Douthit, Blackwater got their first win in 2015 PBA Commissioner's Cup against San Miguel Beermen, 80–77.

In August 2020, it was reported that the team would be changing its name to "Blackwater Bossing". The new branding including the team's logo and jersey design was unveiled in September 2020.

International stint
On July 12, 2018, Blackwater Elite completed a six-game sweep of the Pacific Caesar 50th Anniversary Pro Tournament in Surabaya, Indonesia.

The following week, they represented the Philippines along with NLEX Road Warriors in the Asia League's Summer Super 8 Invitational Tournament held in Macau.

Current roster

Players 

 Dylan Ababou (2016–2017)
 Val Acuña
 Raymond Aguilar (2016–2017)
 Jason Ballesteros (2014–2016)
 Raphael Banal (2016–present)
 Mac Belo (2016–present)
 Gilbert Bulawan (2014–2016)
 Niño Canaleta (2017–present)
 Jerick Cañada
 JR Cawaling
 Robby Celiz
 Reil Cervantes
 Mike Cortez
 Mark Cruz (2017–present)
 Arthur dela Cruz (2015–2017)
 J.P. Erram
 Bryan Faundo
 James Forrester (2016–2017)
 Riego Gamalinda
 Frank Golla (2016)
 Brian Heruela
 Carlo Lastimosa
 Eddie Laure
 Dave Marcelo (2017–present)
 Jason Melano
 Denok Miranda (2016–present)
 Alex Nuyles
 Bobby Ray Parks Jr.
 Kyle Pascual
 Tristan Perez (2016–present)
  (2016–2019)
 Raphael Reyes
 Larry Rodriguez
 Sunday Salvacion
 James Sena
 Roi Sumang
 Chris Timberlake
 Juami Tiongson
 Almond Vosotros

Imports 
  Eric Dawson (2016)
  Imad Qahwash (2016)
  Trevis Simpson (2017)
  Greg Smith (2017)
  Henry Walker (2017)

Retired numbers

  – The team retired his jersey number in his honor during Blackwater's first game in the 2016 PBA Governors' Cup versus the NLEX Road Warriors on July 16, 2016. He collapsed and died during the team's practice on July 3, 2016.

Coaches 

 Leo Isaac (2014–fired 2018)
 Bong Ramos (2018–fired 2019)
 Aries Dimaunahan (2019 as interim coach)
 Nash Racela (2019–fired 2020)
 Ariel Vanguardia (2020–2021 as interim coach)

Season-by-season records

Records from the 2022–23 PBA season:

*one-game playoffs**team had the twice-to-beat advantage

See also
 Blackwater Bossing draft history

References

 
2014 establishments in the Philippines
Basketball teams established in 2014